Eversley Cross is a village in the eastern corner of the Eversley parish in the Hart District of Hampshire, England. It is in the civil parish of Eversley. The village sits at the junction between the B3016 and B3272 roads.

Sport
The village is home to Eversley Cricket Club, which plays in the Thames Valley Cricket League.

Notable buildings
There are several listed buildings in and around Eversley Cross, including the Grade II listed Chequers Inn, part of which dates from the 17th century.

References

External links

Villages in Hampshire